Daryl Lipsey (born 26 June 1963) is a Canadian professional player and coach of ice hockey. Apart from two professional seasons in Canada he has played the majority of his career in the United Kingdom (from 1984–1997). Although he retired as a player in 1997, he continued to coach until 2005. He is also known under the nickname 'Mr. Swindon Hockey' after being the Swindon ice hockey team's Player-Coach for 9 seasons and their Head Coach for one season.

Biography 
Lipsey began his career playing with the Battleford Barons of the Saskatchewan Junior Hockey League in 1982–83. He then played just one more season in Canada with the North Battleford North Stars before leaving Canada to join Bournemouth Stags of the British Hockey League in England.
He spent two seasons with the Stags before joining the Swindon Wildcats for the 1986–1987 season. He played and coached the Wildcats for nine seasons. In 1995–96, he joined the Manchester Storm in the position of player and assistant coach.

He ended his playing career during the 1996-1997 Ice Hockey Superleague season, but continued on the team staff for Manchester Storm for six seasons, and the Swindon Wildcats' team staff for two years. His coaching career finished at Swindon in the 2004-2005 EPIHL season, then Lipsey became Swindon's 'Team Consultant' for one more season before retiring completely from the sport.

Statistics 
For meanings of abbreviations, see ice hockey statistics.

References

External links

1963 births
Canadian ice hockey centres
Canadian ice hockey coaches
Ice hockey people from Saskatchewan
Manchester Storm (1995–2002) players
Living people
Sportspeople from North Battleford
Canadian expatriate ice hockey players in England